A metallocarbohedryne (or met-car for short) is any one of a family of chemical compounds with the generic molecular formula , where M is a transition metal such as titanium, vanadium, zirconium, niobium, hafnium, molybdenum, chromium, or iron.

These compounds have similar properties and a similar molecular structure, with the eight metal atoms at the corners of a somewhat distorted cube, and the twelve carbon atoms, in pairs, placed diagonally across the faces of the cube.  The structure can also be described as two intersecting tetrahedra of metal atoms, with the carbon atoms placed in pairs along the edges of one tetrahedron.  They have been extensively studied in the gas phase, and sometimes dispersed in solid materials, but so far have not been produced in bulk or in solution.  Nevertheless, they have attracted interest because of their stability and symmetry, a relatively low ionization potential, delayed extraction, and possibly interesting magnetic properties.  Some authors suggest that they may eventually find applications in electronics and catalysis.

The name is also used for the corresponding cations  and anions  .

The first papers used the name metallo-carbohedrene (with or without the hyphen) for this type of compound.

History 
The earliest known member of this family is the cation , discovered by Guo, kerns, and Castleman in 1992 while researching the dehydrogenation of various hydrocarbons (including methane, acetylene, ethylene, benzene, and propylene) with titanium atoms, in the gas phase.  Although fullerenes like  were already known, that may have been the first cage-like molecule with metal atoms replacing carbon at some corners of the mesh.  They observed that the cluster would bind eight ammonia molecules, indicating that the eight titanium atoms were exposed.  They also observed the analogous cations with vanadium, zirconium, or hafnium substituted for titanium, the corresponding neutral molecules, and the anion .

Synthesis 
Metallocarbohedrynes can be readily generated by vaporizing the desired metal with a laser, in an atmosphere containing the suitable hydrocarbon.

They have been also detected, at a concentration of 1% or less, in the soot generated by an electric arc between two Ti-C electrodes.

Structure 
The structure of these clusters has been extensively investigated since their discovery. This structure was conjectured to be analogous to that of the hypothetical dodecahedral fullerene . However, this claim was soon disputed by Linus Pauling who proposed an alternative arrangement—with the titanium atoms still at the corners of a cube, but with the carbon atoms pushed inwards so as to be nearly coplanar with the faces of that cube.

Theoretical studies 
In this model, the eight titanium atoms were still equivalent and located at the corners of a cube, with C-C pairs parallel to edges, so that the molecule would have the  symmetry group . Nevertheless, they found the atoms are almost equidistant from the center, (260 pm for C, 262 pm for Ti).

Several other models were proposed. Ceulemans and Fowler proposed a ring of 12 carbon atoms capped by two  tetrahedra. Khan proposed a cage of 12 carbons at the vertices of a cuboctahedron, surrounded by an elongated cage of metal atoms.

Eventually a consensus was reached on a structure proposed by Dance and others, in which the metal atoms are divided in two groups of four ("outer" or "o-", and "inner" or "i-"), at the vertices of two intersecting concentric regular tetrahedra, with different radii and opposite orientations; and the six carbon pairs are aligned with the edges of the larger tetrahedron. This structure can be seen as a deformation of the original proposal, by pulling four vertices of the cube slightly outwards, and rotating the carbon pairs by 45 degrees.

Acceptance of this structure was delayed because the yields of the various clusters  in Guo's process suggested that the eight metal atom sites were equivalent. In particular, the cluster  did not seem to be exceptionally stable.  However, the energy difference between placing the four zirconium atoms in the inner positions, rather than the outer ones, was eventually computed to be only 0.5 kcal/mol.

In 2003, Hou and others predicted a slight displacement of two of the carbon pairs, that reduced the symmetry group to   A similar conclusion had been reached by Chen and others.  However, later studies by Lou and Nordlander concluded that the  form had lower energy (by about 70 kcal/mol) However, the zinc cluster  was predicted to have the symmetrical dodecahedral structure suggested by Guo for the titanium cluster.

Electronically,  is believed to have a metallic character, with 80 delocalized valence electrons. Its static polarizability was computed to be of the same order of magnitude as that of the fullerene .

Spectroscopy and ionization 
Pilgrim and Duncan observed in 1993 that  can be dissociated by visible light.  is a fragment of 

In 1998, Sakurai and Castleman measured ionization potentials of  via near threshold photoionization spectroscopy. The former value was said to be more consistent with the  structure than the  one.

The infrared spectrum of neutral  and of  cations was studied by van Heijnsbergen and others, starting 1999. They measured clusters in the gas phase, accumulated as cations in an ion trap.

They predicted a broad spectrum for both, with high absorption starting at about 8 eV and centered around 12–14 eV.

Reactions 
After creation, the ionized clusters were separated from other species by mass spectrometry, and injected into a drift tube containing the gaseous reactant, diluted in helium.

With theoretical computations, Huo and others predicted that the clusters  and  could bind 4 carbonyls, at outer metal atoms.

Potential applications 
While the clusters have yet to be produced in bulk, they have been investigated theoretically for possible use as catalysts.

Desulfurization of oil 
Specifically, in 2004 Liu and others have simulated the decomposition of thiophene  by three hydrogen molecules to 2-butene  and hydrogen disulfide , catalyzed by a neutral .  This reaction is an important step in the removal of sulfur from oil.  They predicted that the first  molecule would spontaneously dissociate in contact with the  pairs, and each H atom would then migrate to the adjacent outer titanium atom ("o-Ti").  The thiophene would then react exothermally with each H atom in turn, yielding a butadiene attached to an o-Ti and the sulfur atom attached at the nearby inner titanium ("i-Ti") atom. A second  molecule would then dissociate at the o-Ti site and turn butadiene into 2-butene.  A third  would dissociate at an o-Ti site, and the two atoms would migrate to the i-Ti atom bearing the sulfur atom, and convert it into .

See also 
 Titanium carbide
 Iron carbide
 Vanadium carbide

References 

Inorganic carbon compounds